Catherine MacPhail (25 January 1946 – 28 August 2021) was a Scottish-born author. Although she had had other jobs, she always wanted to be a writer but she didn't think she would be suited to it. Her first published work was a sort of "twist-in-the-tale" story in Titbits, followed by a story in the Sunday Post. After she had won a romantic story competition in Woman's Weekly, she decided to concentrate on romantic novels, but after writing two, she decided that it wasn't right for her.
In addition to writing books for children around their teens, she also wrote for adults, she is the author of the BBC Radio 2 series, My Mammy And Me.

Personal life 
MacPhail was married. She had three children, one named Katie, who was the inspiration from her first book. She had two other children. MacPhail said that she would write for free, but she enjoyed being paid for it. On her website, as a child she asked "Do you know what an eejit is? Someone who is one sandwich short of a picnic … whose lift doesn't go … well, you know what I mean. Eejit is a wonderful Scottish/Irish word that seemed to sum me up perfectly when I was growing up." (Eejit is a Scottish/Irish word for someone idiotic or simple.)
"I was always trying to change my image. Act sophisticated, grown up, sensible…and then a story would just plop into my mind and BANG! There I'd go, smack into another fence post."

MacPhail grew up with three sisters and a widowed mother. Although her father died when she was just two. She claimed that "her childhood was full of fun, even though it must have been so hard for my mum. Me and my sisters knew nothing of the hardship she must have had. My mother was always reading books and was never away from the library." MacPhail had stated in her own website she can always remember thinking what a wonderful place it was. You could walk out with a stack full of books and didn't even pay for them! "It was my mum who gave me my love of reading."

"Yet, my own background, my home town, have been the inspiration for most of my writing. A comedy series called My Mammy and Me, another one called We Gotta Get Outta This Place. Set in Greenock, inspired by my own experiences. And my first book, the book that changed my life, Run Zan Run, based on what happened to my own daughter Katie, in Greenock. A tip, if you want to be a writer, don't ever think nothing ever happens to you, because your own life is so interesting, if you just think about it.
My only regret? I wish I had started sooner. But once I'd started? There was no stopping me."

Career 
MacPhail's first children's novel was Run, Zan, Run. It was inspired by her youngest daughter, Katie was being bullied at school and she wanted to raise the awareness of how little help is actually available to children who are being bullied. Run, Zan, Run was the winner of the 1994 Kathleen Fidler Award for new Scottish Writing.
Catherine's next book was entitled Fighting Back, and was about loan-sharking. Fighting Back won one of the first Scottish Arts Council Children's Book Awards in 1999 . This was followed by the novel Fugitive.

She wrote a series of four books entitled Nemesis, which concluded in May 2008.

Novels

Run, Zan, Run (1994)
Fighting Back (1998)
Fugitive (1999) 
Missing (2000)
A Kind of Magic (2001)
Bad Company (2001)
Dark Waters (2003)
Picking on Percy (2003)
Wheels (2003)
Another Me (2003) - Adapted for Cinema
Get That Ghost to Go! (2003)
Catch Us If You Can (2004)
Tribes (2004)
Underworld (2004)
Sticks and Stones (2005)
Roxy's Baby (2005)
Traitors' Gate (2005)
Get That Ghost to Go Too (2006)
Dead Man's Close (2006)
Under the Skin (2007)
Worse Than Boys (2007)
Hide and Seek (2009)
Grass (2009)
Out of the Depths (2011)
Point Danger (2012) 
Annie's Choice (2014) 
Stars shall be Bright (2015) 
The Evil Within (2017) 
White Feather (2018) (with David MacPhail) 
Jack in Goal (2019) (with Mike Phillips) 
Jenny's Choice (2019) 
Missing' '* (n/a)
Series
Granny NothingGranny Nothing (2003)Granny Nothing and the Shrunken Head (2003)Granny Nothing and the Rusty Key (2004)Granny Nothing and the Secret Weapon (2004)Granny Nothing (2009) reprinted by Strident Publishing with new artworkGranny Nothing (2012) reprinted by Strident Publishing Limited with new artwork

NemesisInto the Shadows (2006)The Beast Within (2007)Sinister Intent (2007)
 Ride of Death'' (2008)

References

External links 

 MacPhail's Official Twitter Page
 MacPhail's Facebook Page
 MacPhail's New Official Website (2012)
 MacPhail's Official Website
 Northern Children's Book Festival Bio
 Puffin Author Page
 Fantistic Fiction Author's Index
 Puffin Books Author Biography

1946 births
2021 deaths
People from Greenock
20th-century Scottish novelists
21st-century Scottish novelists
20th-century Scottish women writers
21st-century Scottish women writers